Helen John (30 September 1937 – 5 November 2017) was one of the first full-time members of the Greenham Common peace camp.

Early life
She was born in south-west Essex. Helen Doyle is her birth name.

Career
In September 1981, Helen John, a midwife from Essex, joined a march from Cardiff to Newbury to protest at the siting of ninety-four nuclear missiles at Greenham airbase. 

John was born in Romford to parents who worked at the Ford factory in Dagenham. Growing up during World War II, she recalled how anxious her parents were for the safety of their children during bombing raids which killed numerous friends and family. 

When John left home to join the march in Cardiff, her five children, the youngest of them being only three and a half years old, were to be looked after by her husband. Dissatisfied with the lack of publicity when the march arrived at Greenham RAF base, she decided she would live at the peace camp full-time, away from her family. John observed that while it was acceptable for men to leave their families and go off to war, if women left their families to fight for peace, they were shamed for it. Many women after her chose to do the same. Her experience at Greenham began a lifelong commitment to campaigning against war and for nuclear disarmament. 

She was a formidable part of a movement to alter the nature of non-violent direct action. As a part of a small group, she occupied the sentry box at Greenham’s main gate. The women sang, laughed and whooped at the nonplussed guards. At the trial, John used the public platform to argue her defense politically, a voice which she continued to employ not only to combat the growth of militarism domestically and internationally, but to raise awareness of such injustices as the dreadful conditions in women’s prisons and the commercial exploitation of women worldwide.

Helen John’s contribution also lies in the everyday nature of her activism; teaching women prisoners to read and write, donating clothes or providing women with a meal, a bath and a bed when they needed it. 

Having spent ten years living in a tent at Greenham peace camp, John, now in her mid-fifties, was a seasoned protester and committed feminist. Her activism was characterized by the non-violent direct action pioneered at the peace camp. She had been arrested and imprisoned countless times, thirty-two times for criminal damage alone. She  was one of the first people to be charged under new anti-terror legislation for walking 15ft across a sentry line at RAF Menwith Hill which housed a US eavesdropping operation run by the US National Security Agency.

Despite being described by the media as a ‘Grannie’ or a ‘pensioner’, John’s activism is often considered to be forward-thinking, determined and intellectual. It often mocked the authorities – who are said to have found her ability to disrupt high-security military activities with what she called ‘non-co-operation’ singularly humiliating. Her creative use of non-violent direct action was in part designed to attract the attention of the media and politicians – for instance, standing against Tony Blair for the Sedgefield constituency in the 2001 and 2005 general elections, her campaign conducted from behind bars due to her conviction on charges of criminal damage. In 2001, she finished last of seven candidates, with 260 votes (0.6%), and in 2005 she finished 13th of fifteen candidates, with 68 votes (0.2%).

John’s dedication to the peace movement and upholding the right to protest was expressed in every aspect of her life. Her energetic, challenging and inventive campaigning methods have inspired decades of young activists. After 25 years of tireless work, John was nominated for the Nobel Peace Prize in 2005 for ‘rendering valuable services to the cause of peace, justice and human dignity.’

John remained remained active even in her old age.

In 2012, a documentary web series, Disarming Grandmothers, was released.  This series portrayed the lives of Helen John and, fellow campaigner Sylvia Boyes, from their 'trial for terrorism' concerning the time when they trespassed into RAF Menwith Hill to their family life.. She died peacefully on 5th November 2017, aged 80. John is often considered vital to the modern feminist movement.

See also
 List of peace activists

References

External links
 Disarming Grandmothers

1937 births
2017 deaths
British anti-war activists
English pacifists
English Quakers
Independent British political candidates
British female criminals
English female criminals
People from Essex